The northern cassowary (Casuarius unappendiculatus) also known as the one-wattled cassowary, single-wattled cassowary, or golden-necked cassowary, is a large, stocky flightless bird of northern New Guinea. It is one of the three living species of cassowary, alongside the dwarf cassowary and the southern cassowary. It is a member of the superorder Paleognathae.

Taxonomy
Edward Blyth first identified the northern cassowary from a specimen from an aviary located in Calcutta, India, in 1860. It is the most recently discovered of all the cassowary species. The genus name Casuarius is derived from the Malay word kesuari "cassowary", while the species name unappendiculatus refers to the species' single wattle. Officially, there are no subspecies, though some authors list several subspecies.

Description

The northern cassowary has a hard and stiff black plumage, blue facial skin and a casque on top of the head. It has a bright red or yellow coloured neck and wattle. The feet are huge and strong with long, dagger-like claw on its inner toe. The sexes are similar in appearance.

Phylogeny
Casuariidae is the family of the northern cassowary. There are only four members, three of which are Cassowaries; the other, the only remaining species of emu. All are similar. Emus were classified in a different family until it was decided that they are similar enough to the cassowaries that they could be classified in the same family. All four members of the Casuariidae are large flightless birds. The northern cassowary and the emu share homologous features. For example, both have a blue patch of colour on their face/neck, but the functions of these differ. The emu's patch is of a paler colour and is used as a form of camouflage where it is located. The northern cassowary's patch of blue is brighter, and is used for attracting mates.

Range and habitat
The northern cassowary is distributed and endemic to coastal swamp and lowland rainforests of northern New Guinea and the islands of Yapen, Batanta and Salawati. They prefer elevations below .

Behaviour

As with other cassowaries, the northern cassowary is a shy and solitary bird. Their diet consists mainly of berries, fruits and small animals, such as mice, rats, frogs, snakes, lizards, smaller birds and a variety of small insects and snails. They will eat dead animals when they find them. The young have been observed to eat the feces of the males raising them and clutch mates. Adults will eat their own feces as it often contains undigested fruits. They make grunting and hissing sounds, like other cassowaries.

In the breeding season, the polygamous female lays three to five green eggs on a well camouflaged nest prepared by the male; she then leaves the nest and eggs to find another mate. The male incubates the eggs and raises the chicks alone for about nine months.

Conservation
Although subject to ongoing habitat loss and overhunting in some areas, as of 2017 the northern cassowary is evaluated as Least concern on the IUCN Red List of Threatened Species, as population size estimates suggest that populations are actually larger than previously estimated. However, it is the most threatened of the three extant cassowary types as of 2022. Hunting is still considered the biggest threat. Native people use the bones and eggs, and take the chicks to be raised for meat. As logging opens up more areas of the forest, hunting will be more of a problem.

References

Notes

Sources

External links

 
 
 
 
 

northern cassowary
Birds of Papua New Guinea
Birds of Western New Guinea
northern cassowary
northern cassowary
Endemic fauna of New Guinea